Amity is a rural town and locality in the City of Redland, Queensland, Australia.

It is known as Pulan Pulan by the traditional owners, the Quandamooka people.

Geography
Amity is located on the north western point of North Stradbroke Island (known as Amity Point). Directly north is the South Passage and the southern tip of Moreton Island. To the east lies the small town of Point Lookout and to the south lies the main town of North Stradbroke Island, Dunwich. Wallum Creek snakes along the southern border of the town. Rainbow Channel lies directly adjacent to Amity Point in Moreton Bay.

History

In 1824 John Oxley named the headland Amity Point after the brig Amity he sailed in when establishing the Moreton Bay penal colony. It had been given the name Cypress Point for which it was only known as for a brief period. The site was chosen as a pilot station by John Gray because of its location close to the South Passage into Moreton Bay. It was the first European settlement on Stradbroke Island.

A supply boat called The Otter, which also carried tourists, ran between Brisbane's central business district and Amity from 1885 to 1946.

Amity Point State School opened on 7 April 1919, but closed in 1920. On 22 February 1937, it reopened as Cylinder Beach Provisional School.  After 8 months the school was relocated to a site approx  from Amity Point, where it reopened on 19 October 1937 as Amity Provisional School, but closed on 2 September 1938. On 30 January 1951, the school reopened  as Amity Point State School. It closed permanently on 19 November 1961.

Amity Point Post Office opened around 1942.

St Peter's Anglican Church was dedicated on 29 October 1957 by Venerable Frank Knight. Its closure circa 2018 was approved by Locum Bishop Godfrey Fryar.

The median age of the Amity population was 53 years, compared to the national median age of 37. 86% of people living in Amity were born in Australia. The other top responses for country of birth were England 4.4%, New Zealand 1.7%, Solomon Islands 1.2%, Papua New Guinea 1.2%, Latvia 1.2%. 98% of people spoke only English at home; the next most common language was 0.9% Yumplatok (Torres Strait Creole).

Education 
There are no schools in Amity. The nearest government primary school is Dunwich State School in Dunwich to the south. The nearest government secondary school is Cleveland District State High School in Cleveland on the mainland.

Infrastructure 
Amity has little infrastructure built by either the private or public sectors. Due to this, the town's populace have to end up driving to either Dunwich for health and schooling facilities, or going by ferry or boat to the mainland town of Redlands.

Public sector
The only government infrastructure for the town is a single jetty, a library, a community hall, a Fire Station and a post office. No schools or hospitals are found in the town. This, however, is not due to a lack of government investment for the town, but rather due to the very small size of the town. There are only eighteen roads in the town, with the majority of those very small. Claytons Road, often called Point Lookout Road by the locals, due to the road leading to Point Lookout, is the only road which gives access to Amity from the rest of the island.

The Redland City Council operate the Amity Point Library. It is a very small library being only 22 m² on the veranda of the local community hall and open only 9 hours each week.

Private sector
Private sector investments on the town only cater for the large number of tourists which come to the island every holiday season to make use of the town's beaches. There is a caravan park that caters for the budget traveller in the town. The cricket club at Amity is the only investment by the private sector that is catered for the local populace of the town, though it still receives much business from tourists.

Environment

Amity is surrounded by virgin forests to the south east and pristine beaches elsewhere.

Forests
The forests surrounding Amity are subtropical rainforests with a significant amount of diversity in both flora and fauna. This is despite the fact that North Stradbroke Island, along with Moreton Island to the north and South Stradbroke Island to the south, are made up entirely of sand, a substance that only a few, mostly monocotyledon plants have managed to survive in elsewhere in the world. The three islands also have species of ancient ferns that have survived only on these islands. The flowering rate of these ferns are very slow, and the trees are protected by Australian law so that only the Aboriginals, the original people of the island, may harvest them.

Beaches

Amity Point boasts some of the largest shark numbers in the world, though shark attacks are rare, with only one recorded fatal  attack. Despite the presence of shark drumlines, in places since 1997, a Brisbane woman was mauled to death by sharks while swimming in Rainbow Channel. The species of shark remains unknown, with bull sharks suspected by an expert and tiger sharks suggested by locals.

References

Suburbs of Redland City
Coastal towns in Queensland
1824 establishments in Australia
Populated places established in 1824
North Stradbroke Island
Localities in Queensland